Sylvain Lazarus (born 1943) is a French sociologist, anthropologist and political theorist. He has also written under the pseudonym Paul Sandevince. Lazarus is a professor at the Paris 8 University.

Life and work
Sylvain Lazarus worked out a theory of the social function of political categorizations (cf. Anthropology of the Name, 1996), exploring in the anthropological field what his Lacanian friends Alain Badiou (Being and Event, 1988) and Jean-Claude Milner (The Indistinct Names, 1983) worked out, respectively, in the fields of philosophy, of linguistics and of psychoanalytic theory.

Lazarus's 1996 book 'Anthropologie du nom' (Anthropology of the Name) was translated into English in 2015. Previously, it was discussed at length by Alain Badiou in his Abrégé de Métapolitique (1998), now translated into English as Metapolitics (2005).

L'Organisation Politique
To quote Badiou himself, the UCFml is "the Maoist organization established in late 1969 by Natacha Michel, Sylvain Lazarus, myself and a fair number of young people". Fifteen years later, Lazarus was a founding member (along with Badiou and Michel) of the militant French political organisation  which called itself a post-party organization concerned with direct popular intervention in a wide range of issues (including immigration, labor, and housing). In addition to numerous writings and interventions since the 1980s, L'Organisation Politique has stressed the importance of developing political prescriptions concerning undocumented migrants (in France referred to as les sans papiers) and stresses that they must be conceived primarily as workers and not immigrants.

International Observatory on Suburbs and Outskirts
Since the 1990s, Sylvain Lazarus has focused much of his activism on the French suburbs (the banlieues). With the French anthropologist Alain Bertho, he founded, in 2008, l'Observatoire international des banlieues et des périphéries (OIBP) and which has produced studies in France, Brazil and Senegal.

Bibliography
Author:
(French) 'Althusser, la politique et l’histoire'. In S. Lazarus (ed.) Politique et philosophie dans l’oeuvre de Louis Althusser. Paris: Presses Universitaires de France, 1993.
(French) Anthropologie du nom. Paris: Seuil, 1996.
(English translation) Anthropology of the Name. Translated by Gila Walker. Seagull Books, 2015. 
(French)  "Anthropologie ouvrière et enquêtes d’usine; état des lieux et problématique". In Revue Ethnologie Française, numéro 3, 2001.
(French) Introduction to Ethnologie française n°III/2001 consacré à l'anthropologie ouvrière
(French) "Desir de Revolution".In  Lignes  n°04 : (février 2002)
(English) "Lenin and the Party, 1902 – November 1917". In Lenin Reloaded: Toward a Politics of Truth. Durham: Duke University Press, 2007.
Co-author, editor:
(French) L'art dégénéré – Actes d'une exposition, Aix-en-Provence, juin 1998 :Jean-Paul Curnier, Sylvain Lazarus, Jean-Pierre Faye, Alain Badiou  – Editeur: Al Dante (Editions) (1998)
(French) Politique et philosophie dans l'oeuvre de Louis Althusser – Pratiques théoriques éditeur : Presses Universitaires France (1993)
Conference Director:
 Chercher ailleurs et autrement. Sur la doctrine des lieux, l’économie, l’effondrement du socialisme  Conférence du Perroquet – 1992

Using the pseudonym Paul Sandevince
all articles in French:
various articles in the Maoist journal of the UCFML.Qu'est-ce qu'une Politique Marxiste  Éditions Potemkine –  January 1978. Notes de travail sur le post-léninisme Éditions Potemkine –  1981.

References

Further reading
 Alain Badiou:Metapolitics, 2005Logics of Worlds: 'Being and Event', Volume 2, 2009. Here, Badiou discusses the ongoing importance for him of Lazarus's work and political interventions. See in particular the extensive endnotes in the back section of this volume. The index points to other references to Lazarus in this volume.
 Michael Neocosmos, The Political Conditions of Social Thought and the Politics of Emancipation: An Introduction to the work of Sylvain Lazarus, 2009

External links
Time and Voluntarism in Badiou and Lazarus – an essay on Anthropology of the Name'' by Daniel Tutt

1943 births
Living people
French Marxists
20th-century French philosophers
French sociologists
French Maoists
Academic staff of Paris 8 University Vincennes-Saint-Denis